Major Eustace Loder, JP (16th May 1867 – 27 July 1914) was an Irish horse racer and sportsman.

Biography

Early life
Born in Sussex on May 16th 1867, Major Eustace Loder was educated at Eton College and Trinity College Cambridge.

Career

Military 
In University as a candidate he received his commission into the 12th Royal Lancers in 1887. He was Adjutant of his regiment from 1895 to 1899. and was popular among his brother officers. In 1902 Major Loder sent in his papers, and took up his quarters at Eyrefield Lodge, the Curragh, County Kildare, which he had purchased in 1896, on the death of its previous owner, Mr. Linde.

Riding 

Loder had begun racing soon after he had entered the Army, having registered his father's old colours, yellow, dark blue sleeves and black cap, in 1889; these were first carried in Major Loder's name by steeplechasers. The first good Steeplechasers he possessed was Field Marshall, by Border Minstrel out of Rouge Gagne. Field Marshall won numerous races in good company, among them the Mammoth Hunters' Steeplechase at Sandown Park Racecourse in 1892, and the Grand Military Gold Cup in 1895, which he latter won in a canter by five lengths, with 'Soarer' and 'Midshipmite' among the ten behind him: Captain Crawley rode the horse in both races. Other good performers between flags owned by Major Loder at various times have been:

Hackler-Cinnamon, who four times won the Conyngham Cup at Punchestown Racecourse; 
Marpessa, winner of the Grand Military Gold Cup at Sandown Park Racecourse in 1903;
Shaker, winner of the Sefton Steeplechase in 1898
Covert Hack
Banstead
Yorkshireman
Soltykoff
Cornelius
Ravenswood

The first important flat race that fell to Major Loder was the Ascot Stakes which was won by the four-year-old mare Billow, in 1892. She had been purchased from Tom Cannon, by whom Major Loder's horses were trained; Billow subsequently became the dam of Saltpetre. In 1896, as already said, Major Loder bought Eyrefield Lodge; on acquiring the place he bought over his brood mares from England and established his Stud (animal) there. He began well in his new quarters, for it was in 1898 that Astrology threw Star Shoot to Isinglass (horse). Star Shoot's two-year-old career promised a great future. During the season of 1900 he won three races, and ran a dead heat with Ian for the National Stakes (Sandown Park), crediting his owner with 4,430 sovs. Unfortunately, Star Shoot became roarer, and was therefore sold to go to America.

In 1901 Major Loder's best horse was Game Chick, a brown filly by Gallinule out of a mare named Tierce, for which Major Loder had paid 360 gs. As a yearling at the Yardley Stud Sale in 1892. Tierce proved an excellent investment; for Game Chick in 1901 obtained six brackets, the total value of her wins exceeding 9.000 sovs. Her first win was the Princess's Cup for two-year-olds at the Newmarket Racecourse First July; her next the National Stakes (Sandown Park); her third win was note-worthy, in as much as it was the Champagne Stakes (Great Britain) at Doncaster, when she beat Sceptre, who started at 11 to 8 on. After winning the Autumn Breeders' Plate easily and the Michaelmas Plate by two lengths at Manchaster, she finished her two-year-old career in a sensational fashion by beating Ard Patrick a neck for the Dewhurst Plate. Game Chick  afterwards became property of Sir Tatton Sykes, 5th Baronet.

Personal life
He remained Unmarried for his whole life, but was seen spending his family time with his eldest brother 
Sir Edmund Giles Loder, 2nd Baronet (1849–1920).
And he regularly met with his Sibling's on other occasions
 Wilfrid Hans Loder (1851–1902).
 Etheldreda Mary Loder (1853–1921). She married Sir Charles Raymond Burrell, 6th Baronet on 22 July 1872
 Lt.-Col. Alfred Basil Loder (1855–1905).
 Clare Robert Loder (1857–1857).
 Adela Maria Loder (1859–1915).
 Gerald Loder, 1st Baron Wakehurst (1861–1936). He  married Lady Louise de Vere Beauclerk, eldest daughter of William Beauclerk, 10th Duke of St Albans, in 1890.
 Reginald Bernhard Loder (1864–1931).
 Sydney Loder (1867–1944).
 Eustace Loder(1867–1914).

References

1867 births
1914 deaths
Horse breeders
People educated at Eton College
Alumni of Trinity College, Cambridge
Justices of the peace